The Curse of Singapore Sling (also known simply as The Curse Of) is the first studio album by the Icelandic neo-psychedelia band Singapore Sling. It was released in August 2002 by record label Hitt.

Background 
An 8-track demo version of the opening track, "Overdriver", was made available online on the Iceland Airwaves music festival website in 2001, titled "Overdrive".

The closing track, "Dirty Water", was a cover of the 1966 hit single by garage rock band the Standells.

Edda (Hitt Records), the now-defunct Icelandic label, produced a music video for "Listen". No single was actually released. The black-and-white clip was directed by Arni Thor Jonsson from the Reykjavík studio Sagofilm and was released in Iceland on 22 October 2002. It shows girls from a volleyball league wearing bikinis and dancing.

Release 
The album was released in August 2002 on CD by Hitt Records, and was licensed and released in the United States a year later by the independent label Stinky Records.

Track listing 
 "Overdriver" – 3:46
 "Summer Garden" – 2:56
 "Nuthin' Ain't Bad" – 3:38
 "Midnight" – 5:33
 "No Soul Man" – 4:21
 "Roadkill" (instrumental) – 4:36
 "Listen" – 4:31
 "Heart of Chrome" – 3:07
 "Chantissity" – 3:46
 "Dirty Water" (The Standells cover) – 6:46

References

External links 

 

2002 debut albums
Singapore Sling (band) albums